Khouth is a surname.

Notable people who carry this name:
 Samuel Vincent Khouth, Canadian actor, voiced Edd a.k.a. Double D from Ed, Edd n Eddy
 Gabe Khouth, Canadian actor, voiced Nicol Amalfi in Gundam SEED and portrayed Sneezy/Dr. Clark in the Once Upon a Time TV series

Surnames